Neoapachella is a monotypic genus of North American mygalomorph trapdoor spiders in the family Euctenizidae containing the single species, Neoapachella rothi. It was first described by Jason Bond & B. D. Opell in 2002, and has only been found in Arizona and New Mexico. It is named in honor of the Apaches as well as arachnologist Vincent D. Roth.

References

Euctenizidae
Fauna of the Southwestern United States
Monotypic Mygalomorphae genera
Spiders of the United States